Parocystola acroxantha is a species of moth of the family Oecophoridae. It is endemic to New Zealand, but has been introduced in Great Britain.

Larvae feed have been recorded on Eucalyptus and Berberis species.

References

Oecophorinae